Venture Academy (formerly Arden Fields School) is a coeducational special school located in Henley-in-Arden, Warwickshire, England.

The school admits pupils aged 9 to 16 with autism and/or a social, emotional or mental health diagnosis. Pupils come from within Warwickshire along with a small number from neighbouring authorities.

Venture Academy aims to provide a welcoming, safe and stable learning environment where pupils can learn the skills of acceptable behaviour and make good academic progress. Pupils follow a standard timetable covering all core and many optional subjects, and all have the chance to take part in enrichment programs in and out of school.

The farm (The Barn Project)
At Riverhouse students help run the school farm, on the farm students look after pigs, chickens, rabbits, quails, and other small animals.

References

Special schools in Warwickshire
Academies in Warwickshire
Henley-in-Arden